The European Parliament election of 2009 took place on 6–7 June 2009.

The Democratic Party was the most voted list in Trentino (27.9%), narrowly ahead of The People of Freedom (26.3%), while the South Tyrolean People's Party (SVP) came first as usual in South Tyrol (52.1%) and got its leading candidate Herbert Dorfmann elected to the European Parliament. In the Province of Trento the Union for Trentino supported both the Trentino Tyrolean Autonomist Party and the Union of the Centre, that both had good results, 8.2% and 6.1% respectively.

Results

Trentino

Source: Ministry of the Interior

South Tyrol

Source: Ministry of the Interior

2009 elections in Italy
Elections in Trentino-Alto Adige/Südtirol
European Parliament elections in Italy
2009 European Parliament election